The Weird: A Compendium of Strange and Dark Stories is an anthology of weird fiction edited by Ann and Jeff VanderMeer.

Published on 30 Oct 2011, it contains 110 short stories, novellas and short novels. At 1,152 pages in the hardcover edition, it is probably the largest single volume of fantastic fiction ever published, according to Locus.

Contents
The editors' object in publishing The Weird was to provide, through its contents, a comprehensive definition of "the Weird", a type of fiction that their introduction describes as "as much a sensation"—one of terror and wonder—"as (...) a mode of writing", and as a type of fiction that entertains while also expressing readers' dissatisfaction with, and uncertainty about, reality. To that end, The Weird includes works that range from fantasy, science fiction and mainstream literature "with a slight twist of strange", but it also amounts, according to The Guardian, to "a history of the horror story".

The editors limited their chronologically ordered collection to fiction from the twentieth and twenty-first centuries, and largely avoided including stories focusing on tropes of the horror genre such as zombies, vampires, and werewolves, to highlight what they considered the Weird's innovative qualities. To cover the genre comprehensively, they commissioned original translations of, among others, works by Ryūnosuke Akutagawa, Michel Bernanos, Julio Cortázar and Georg Heym.

The anthology contains the following works: 

 Foreweird by Michael Moorcock
 Introduction by Ann and Jeff VanderMeer
 Alfred Kubin, The Other Side (excerpt), 1908 (translation, Austria)
 F. Marion Crawford, The Screaming Skull, 1908
 Algernon Blackwood, The Willows, 1907
 Saki, Sredni Vashtar, 1910
 M.R. James, Casting the Runes, 1911
 Lord Dunsany, How Nuth Would Have Practiced his Art, 1912
 Gustav Meyrink, The Man in the Bottle, 1912 (translation, Austria)
 Georg Heym, The Dissection, 1913 (new translation, Germany)
 Hanns Heinz Ewers, The Spider, 1915 (translation, Germany)
 Rabindranath Tagore, The Hungry Stones, 1916 (India)
 Luigi Ugolini, The Vegetable Man, 1917 (first translation, Italy)
 A. Merritt, The People of the Pit, 1918
 Ryunosuke Akutagawa, The Hell Screen, 1917 (new translation, Japan)
 Francis Stevens (Gertrude Barrows Bennett), Unseen—Unfeared, 1919
 Franz Kafka, In the Penal Colony, 1919 (translation, German/Czech)
 Stefan Grabinski, The White Weyrak, 1921 (translation, Poland)
 H.F. Arnold, The Night Wire, 1926
 H.P. Lovecraft, The Dunwich Horror, 1929
 Margaret Irwin, The Book, 1930
 Jean Ray, The Mainz Psalter, 1930 (translation, Belgium)
 Jean Ray, The Shadowy Street, 1931 (translation, Belgium)
 Clark Ashton Smith, Genius Loci, 1933
 Hagiwara Sakutaro, The Town of Cats, 1935 (translation, Japan)
 Hugh Walpole, The Tarn, 1936
 Bruno Schulz, Sanatorium at the Sign of the Hourglass, 1937 (translation, Poland)
 Robert Barbour Johnson, Far Below, 1939
 Fritz Leiber, Smoke Ghost, 1941
 Leonora Carrington, White Rabbits, 1941
 Donald Wollheim, Mimic, 1942
 Ray Bradbury, The Crowd, 1943
 William Sansom, The Long Sheet, 1944
 Jorge Luis Borges, The Aleph, 1945 (translation, Argentina)
 Olympe Bhely-Quenum, A Child in the Bush of Ghosts, 1949 (Benin)
 Shirley Jackson, The Summer People, 1950
 Margaret St. Clair, The Man Who Sold Rope to the Gnoles, 1951
 Robert Bloch, The Hungry House, 1951
 Augusto Monterroso, Mister Taylor, 1952 (new translation, Guatemala)
 Amos Tutuola, The Complete Gentleman, 1952 (Nigeria)
 Jerome Bixby, It's a Good Life, 1953
 Julio Cortázar, Axolotl, 1956 (new translation, Argentina)
 William Sansom, A Woman Seldom Found, 1956
 Charles Beaumont, The Howling Man, 1959
 Mervyn Peake, Same Time, Same Place, 1963
 Dino Buzzati, The Colomber, 1966 (new translation, Italy)
 Michel Bernanos, The Other Side of the Mountain, 1967 (new translation, France)
 Merce Rodoreda, The Salamander, 1967 (translation, Catalan)
 Claude Seignolle, The Ghoulbird, 1967 (new translation, France)
 Gahan Wilson, The Sea Was Wet As Wet Could Be, 1967
 Daphne Du Maurier, Don’t Look Now, 1971
 Robert Aickman, The Hospice, 1975
 Dennis Etchison, It Only Comes Out at Night, 1976
 James Tiptree Jr. (Alice Sheldon), The Psychologist Who Wouldn’t Do Terrible Things to Rats, 1976
 Eric Basso, The Beak Doctor, 1977
 Jamaica Kincaid, Mother, 1978 (Antigua and Barbuda/US)
 George R.R. Martin, Sandkings, 1979
 Bob Leman, Window, 1980
 Ramsey Campbell, The Brood, 1980
 Michael Shea, The Autopsy, 1980
 William Gibson / John Shirley, The Belonging Kind, 1981
 M. John Harrison, Egnaro, 1981
 Joanna Russ, The Little Dirty Girl, 1982
 M. John Harrison, The New Rays, 1982
 Premendra Mitra, The Discovery of Telenapota, 1984 (translation, India)
 F. Paul Wilson, Soft, 1984
 Octavia Butler, Bloodchild, 1984
 Clive Barker, In the Hills, the Cities, 1984
 Leena Krohn, Tainaron, 1985 (translation, Finland)
 Garry Kilworth, Hogfoot Right and Bird-hands, 1987
 Lucius Shepard, Shades, 1987
 Harlan Ellison, The Function of Dream Sleep, 1988
 Ben Okri, Worlds That Flourish, 1988 (Nigeria)
 Elizabeth Hand, The Boy in the Tree, 1989
 Joyce Carol Oates, Family, 1989
 Poppy Z Brite, His Mouth Will Taste of Wormwood, 1990
 Michal Ajvaz, The End of the Garden, 1991 (translation, Czech)
 Karen Joy Fowler, The Dark, 1991
 Kathe Koja, Angels in Love, 1991
 Haruki Murakami, The Ice Man, 1991 (translation, Japan)
 Lisa Tuttle, Replacements, 1992
 Marc Laidlaw, The Diane Arbus Suicide Portfolio, 1993
 Steven Utley, The Country Doctor, 1993
 William Browning Spencer, The Ocean and All Its Devices, 1994
 Jeffrey Ford, The Delicate, 1994
 Martin Simpson, Last Rites and Resurrections, 1994
 Stephen King, The Man in the Black Suit, 1994
 Angela Carter, The Snow Pavilion, 1995
 Craig Padawer, The Meat Garden, 1996
 Stepan Chapman, The Stiff and the Stile, 1997
 Tanith Lee, Yellow and Red, 1998
 Kelly Link, The Specialist’s Hat, 1998
 Caitlin R. Kiernan, A Redress for Andromeda, 2000
 Michael Chabon, The God of Dark Laughter, 2001
 China Miéville, Details, 2002
 Michael Cisco, The Genius of Assassins, 2002
 Neil Gaiman, Feeders and Eaters, 2002
 Jeff VanderMeer, The Cage, 2002
 Jeffrey Ford, The Beautiful Gelreesh, 2003
 Thomas Ligotti, The Town Manager, 2003
 Brian Evenson, The Brotherhood of Mutilation, 2003
 Mark Samuels, The White Hands, 2003
 Daniel Abraham, Flat Diane, 2004
 Margo Lanagan, Singing My Sister Down, 2005 (Australia)
 T.M. Wright, The People on the Island, 2005
 Laird Barron, The Forest, 2007
 Liz Williams, The Hide, 2007
 Reza Negarestani, The Dust Enforcer, 2008 (Iran)
 Micaela Morrissette, The Familiars, 2009
 Steve Duffy, In the Lion’s Den, 2009
 Stephen Graham Jones, Little Lambs, 2009
 K.J. Bishop, Saving the Gleeful Horse, 2010 (Australia)
 Afterweird by China Miéville

The introduction notes that certain stories were not included because of problems with obtaining the reproduction rights, but that the editors considered these stories as an extension of the anthology: Philip K. Dick's The Preserving Machine, J. G. Ballard's The Drowned Giant, Gabriel García Márquez's A Very Old Man with Enormous Wings and Otsuichi's The White House in the Cold Forest.

Reception
The anthology was well received by reviewers from the Financial Times, who called it an "authoritative" representation of weird fiction, the San Francisco Chronicle, who considered that the volume's broad range of authors proved that "the bizarre and unsettling belong to no one race, country or gender" and Publishers Weekly, who characterized it as a "standard-setting compilation" and a "deeply affectionate and respectful history of speculative fiction’s blurry edges".

Locus magazine's reviewer noted that the anthology's chronological order allowed the reader to construct a "fossil record" of the Weird's evolution. He wrote that its broad geographical scope made noticeable the distinct traditions of English-language weird fiction, which depict the "eruption of the inexplicable into meticulously ordered realities", and the traditions represented by many translated works, whose cultures are more thoroughly grounded in folklore and mythology, or which resist a Western impulse toward rationalism and realism. Damien Walter, writing for The Guardian in a pastiche of the genre's style, warned of "the madness of the many authors contained in its pages and clearly inhuman determination of its 'editors'", prophesying that "Soon the chrysalid will form, and The Weird itself will burst into the world as a radiant winged moth of metaphysical doom!"

The Weird received the British Fantasy Award for best anthology in 2012.

References

Weird fiction
Atlantic Books books
2011 anthologies